Apoxyptilus anthites is a species of moth in the family Pterophoridae. It is known to originate from Kenya, South Africa, Tanzania and Uganda.

The wingspan is 9–11 mm.

The larvae feed on the buds of Dombeya emarginata.

Etymology
The generic name indicates that this genus not closely related to Oxyptilus.

References

Oxyptilini
Moths of Africa
Moths described in 1936